The Institution of Diesel and Gas Turbine Engineers is the professional association for engineers in the diesel and gas turbine industry in the UK and internationally.

Diesel engines and gas turbines are broadly related because they use a similar thermodynamic cycle, and both are often used (and interchangeable) for power generation for heating and electricity in large installations.

History
It was established in 1913 as the Diesel Engine Users' Association. It changed to its current name in 1984.

Structure
It is based in the north-west of Bedford towards Brickhill at Bedford Heights

Types of membership are Student, Associate, Member, Fellow, Retired, Retired Associate, Company and Subscriber.

Function
It represents engineers in the diesel and gas turbine industry in the UK and internationally, enabling current knowledge to be widely known. It organises conferences and industry-based training.

It registers Chartered Engineers Incorporated Engineers and Engineering Technicians in the industry.

See also
 Energy Institute
 Royal Aeronautical Society
 National Gas Turbine Establishment

References

External links
 IDGTE

1913 establishments in the United Kingdom
Organizations established in 1913
Organisations based in Bedford
Mechanical engineering organizations
ECUK Licensed Members
Energy in the United Kingdom
Energy business associations
Gas turbines
Diesel engines